Tanja Machalet ( Breuer, born 1 May 1974) is a German politician of the Social Democratic Party (SPD). Machalet became a member of the Bundestag in the 2021 German federal election and she represents the constituency of Montabaur.

Political career

Career in state politics
Machalet was deputy federal chairman of the Jusos from 1999 to 2003, of which she had been a member since 1991. In 2009, she was the SPD's candidate for district administrator in the Westerwald district, but lost to Achim Schwickert of the CDU. In 2011 and 2016, Machalet ran for the Rhineland-Palatinate state parliament in the electoral district of Montabaur and entered the state parliament for the SPD on the state list in both cases. In the legislative period from 2016, she was a member of the Budget and Finance Committee, the Committee for Social Affairs and Labor, and the Committee for Health, Care and Demography. She was also the budget policy spokesperson for the SPD parliamentary group.

Machalet is a member of the municipal council of the Wallmerod municipality and the district council of the Westerwald district.

In March 2020, Machalet announced that she would not run again in the election for the 18th state parliament of Rhineland-Palatinate. The district executive of the SPD in the Westerwaldkreis nominated Machalet to succeed Gabi Weber in the Bundestag constituency of Montabaur for the election to the 20th German Bundestag. On March 20, 2021, she was elected by the relevant delegate conference as the SPD direct candidate in the Bundestag constituency of Montabaur.

Member of the German Parliament, 2021–present
In the 2021 elections|, Machalet was elected to the German Bundestag as a direct candidate in the Montabaur constituency.

Within her parliamentary group, Machalet belongs to the Parliamentary Left, a left-wing movement.

References 

Living people
1974 births
Place of birth missing (living people)
Members of the Bundestag for the Social Democratic Party of Germany
Members of the Bundestag 2021–2025
Female members of the Bundestag
21st-century German women politicians